Nancy Ma's night monkey (Aotus nancymaae) is a night monkey species from South America. It is found in Brazil and Peru. The species is named after Dr. Nancy Shui-Fong Ma.

It is known in medical research as a model organism for studying the Duffy antigen. Nancy Ma's night monkeys have also been found to have an evolutionary pattern change in the hormone oxytocin. It was believed that all placental mammals had the same OXT amino acid chain until the discovery of a change in this New World monkey and others.

References

Nancy Ma's night monkey
Mammals of Brazil
Mammals of Peru
Nancy Ma's night monkey
Nancy Ma's night monkey
Taxobox binomials not recognized by IUCN